Kozlov is a municipality and village in Olomouc District in the Olomouc Region of the Czech Republic. It has about 300 inhabitants.

Administrative parts
The village of Slavkov is an administrative part of Kozlov.

History
The first written mention of Kozlov is from 1324. In 1930 it had 526 inhabitants.

Kozlov became a separate municipality on 1 January 2016 by reduction of Libavá Military Training Area.

References

Villages in Olomouc District